Wheeler Correctional Facility is a privately operated, medium-security prison for men, owned and operated by CoreCivic under contract with the Georgia Department of Corrections.  The facility was built in 1998 in Alamo, Wheeler County, Georgia.

The maximum capacity of the prison is 3028 inmates.

References

Prisons in Georgia (U.S. state)
Buildings and structures in Wheeler County, Georgia
CoreCivic
1998 establishments in Georgia (U.S. state)